Hessa bint Sultan Al Jaber is a Qatari engineer, academic and politician. She was the first Minister of Information and Communications Technology in Qatar following the formation of a new cabinet by the Emir Sheikh Tamim Bin Hamad Al Thani in 2013. In 2017 she was one of four women appointed to the Consultative Assembly, becoming one of the country's first female parliamentarians.

Education

Dr. Hessa holds a Bachelor of Science in Engineering from Kuwait University (1981), and a master's degree and Ph.D in Computer Science from George Washington University in Washington, D.C. (1990).

Career
Prior to becoming a minister, Al Jaber held the position of Secretary General of The Supreme Council of Information and Communication Technology (ictQATAR) since its inception in 2005. 

In June 2016, she was appointed to the supervisory board of the Volkswagen Group. At the United Nations, she is a member of a commission for digital development. She is a member of the board of directors of the American School of Doha and of the Meeza.

Currently, she is United Nations ITU Broadband Commissioner for Digital Development, Commissioner for the WHO/ITU Commission on Information and Accountability for Women and Children's Health, and a member of several boards of directors, including; Qatar University’s Board of Trustees, the Board of Governors of the American School of Doha, Bloomsbury Qatar Foundation Journals, Qatar Foundation National Research Forum, the Qatar Financial Markets Authority, and the Network of Global Agenda Councils of the WEF. She is also the Board Chairperson of Qatar Satellite Company (Es’hailSat), the Chairperson of Mada’s Board of Directors, the Malomatia IT Services Authority, and chair of the Board of Trustees of the Community College of Qatar (CCQ).

Hessa al Jaber is chairman of Trio Investment, a technology investment company that invests in health technology.

Al Jaber was appointed to the Consultative Council in November 2017 by Emir Tamim bin Hamad Al Thani.

With wide knowledge of ICT development, Al Jaber is a contributor to several working papers, studies, and researches at relevant Arab and global conferences and symposiums.

Awards and recognition
In recognition of her public service, Al Jaber was honored by the ministry of interior as the "National Figure of the Year" on 24 December 2008 to honor key Qatari figures which made significant contributions during that year. In 2012, she was also named the 30th most powerful Arab woman by Arabian Business.

In 2013, she was listed among the 500 most powerful Arabs in the world on Arabian Business magazine, then ranked 20th on the 2013 Arabian Business’ list of 100 most powerful Arab women and, most recently, the Internet Society inducted her as one of eight international Internet leaders to the 2013 Internet Hall of Fame Advisory Board. Moreover, Mashable, which covers global social media news, named her among the eight most impressive women working in technology throughout the world during the 2000s.

References

Living people
Kuwait University alumni
George Washington University alumni
Academic staff of Qatar University
21st-century women politicians
Government ministers of Qatar
Year of birth missing (living people)
Qatar Foundation people
Women government ministers of Qatar
Members of the Consultative Assembly of Qatar
Information ministers of Qatar